Thayer may refer to:

Places
United States
 Thayer, Illinois
 Thayer, Indiana
 Thayer, Iowa
 Thayer, Kansas
 Thayer, Michigan
 Thayer, Missouri
 Thayer, Nebraska
Thayer, West Virginia
 Thayer County, Nebraska
 Thayer Street, Providence, Rhode Island
 Thayer Township, Thurston County, Nebraska
 Mount Thayer, a mountain in the Santa Cruz Mountains of California

Education
United States
 Thayer Academy in Braintree, Massachusetts
 Thayer Hall, a Harvard University dormitory
 Thayer Learning Center, Kidder, Missouri
 Thayer School of Engineering, Dartmouth College

Other
 Thayer (name), including a list of people with the name
 Thayer's gull
 Thayer Valve, a valve for trombones
  C.A. Thayer, a schooner preserved at the San Francisco Maritime National Historical Park.

See also
 Justice Thayer (disambiguation)